Mikhail Petrovich Simonov (19 October 1929 – 4 March 2011) was a Russian aircraft designer famed for creating the Sukhoi Su-27 fighter-bomber, the Soviet Union's answer to the American F-15 Eagle. After the dissolution of the Soviet Union in 1991, Simonov coordinated the Su-27's sale to foreign governments, providing badly needed hard currency to the Russian government. In recognition of his achievements, he was named a Hero of the Russian Federation in 1999.

Simonov was born 19 October 1929 in Rostov-on-Don. He became an aviation engineer in the 1950s and joined Sukhoi as a deputy chief designer in 1970. In his time at Sukhoi, he developed the Sukhoi Su-24 bomber and the Sukhoi Su-25 ground-attack airplane, as well as the Su-27. He was the Soviet Union's deputy minister of aircraft industries from 1979 to 1983.

References 

 The Associated Press. "Mikhail Simonov, 81, Designer of Soviet Air Force Workhorse, Dies", The New York Times. March 4, 2011. Retrieved March 5, 2011.

1929 births
2011 deaths
Russian aerospace engineers
Heroes of the Russian Federation
Soviet aerospace engineers
20th-century Russian engineers